Anatolie Ilarionovich Guidea (born 21 January 1977) is a Moldovan-born Bulgarian wrestler. Since 2000 he represents Bulgaria in international competitions.

He represented Bulgaria at the 2012 Summer Olympics in the Men's freestyle 60 kg and ranked 13th.

References

External links
 

1977 births
Living people
Bulgarian male sport wrestlers
Moldovan male sport wrestlers
Naturalised citizens of Bulgaria
Olympic wrestlers of Bulgaria
Wrestlers at the 2012 Summer Olympics
World Wrestling Championships medalists
Moldovan expatriate sportspeople
European Wrestling Championships medalists